Metachroma texanum is a species of leaf beetle. It is found in coastal states of the southeastern United States, ranging from Texas to Florida. Its length is between 3.5 and 4.0 mm. It was first described by the American entomologist Charles Frederic August Schaeffer in 1919.

References

Further reading

 

Eumolpinae
Articles created by Qbugbot
Beetles described in 1919
Beetles of the United States
Taxa named by Charles Frederic August Schaeffer